The Church of St Edward King and Martyr in Goathurst, Somerset, England dates from the 14th century and has been designated as a Grade I listed building.

The parish was originally part of the Royal Forest of North Petherton and its first squire owned St Edward's church. The dedication to Edward the Martyr is unusual, Edward was a young Saxon king who was murdered by his stepmother Elfrida in 978 at Corfe Castle in Dorset so that her own son would become king.

The church includes a 19th-century monument to three-year-old Isabella Kemeys, showing the child lying on a pillow holding a broken flower, and monuments to the Kemeys-Tynte family of Halswell House.

See also

 List of Grade I listed buildings in Sedgemoor
 List of towers in Somerset
 List of ecclesiastical parishes in the Diocese of Bath and Wells

References

14th-century church buildings in England
Church of England church buildings in Sedgemoor
Grade I listed churches in Somerset
Grade I listed buildings in Sedgemoor